Lake Ozhogino is a large shallow freshwater lake in Sakha, Russia. It has an area of 157 km².  It freezes up in late September and stays icebound until June. Ozhogin River (Indigirka's tributary) flows from the lake.

Geography
The lake is located in the Aby Lowland —part of the East Siberian Lowland, by the southeastern slopes of the Polousny Range. It is the largest of the 15,000 Aby Lakes. Lake Suturuokha lies a short distance to the west.

References

External links

Ozhogino
East Siberian Lowland